Judge Weber may refer to:

Gerald Joseph Weber (1914–1989), judge of the United States District Court for the Western District of Pennsylvania
Herman Jacob Weber (born 1927), judge of the United States District Court for the Southern District of Ohio
Randolph Henry Weber (1909–1961), judge of the United States District Court for the Eastern District of Missouri

See also
E. Richard Webber (born 1942), judge of the United States District Court for the Eastern District of Missouri
Justice Weber (disambiguation)